Andrey Atanasov (born 9 April 1987) is a Bulgarian footballer who currently plays as a forward for Dimitrovgrad.

He previously played for Yantra Gabrovo, Volov Shumen, Chernomorets Pomorie, Lokomotiv Sofia, Banants Yerevan, Botev Vratsa, Lokomotiv Plovdiv and Calisia Kalisz.

References

External links
 

1987 births
Living people
People from Gabrovo
Bulgarian footballers
FC Pomorie players
FC Lokomotiv 1929 Sofia players
FC Urartu players
FC Botev Vratsa players
PFC Lokomotiv Plovdiv players
FK Rudar Pljevlja players
FC Spartak Plovdiv players
FC Levski Karlovo players
First Professional Football League (Bulgaria) players
Armenian Premier League players
Expatriate footballers in Armenia
Expatriate footballers in Poland
Expatriate footballers in Montenegro
Bulgarian expatriates in Montenegro
Bulgarian expatriate sportspeople in Armenia
Association football forwards